Minicia elegans is a species of spiders in the family Linyphiidae. It is found in Portugal and Algeria.

References

 Minicia elegans at the World Spider Catalog

Linyphiidae
Spiders described in 1894